Ilka Chase (April 8, 1905 – February 15, 1978) was an American actress, radio host, and novelist.

Biography
Born in New York City and educated at convent and boarding schools in the United States, England, and France, Chase was the only child of Francis Dane Chase, a merchant mariner who became a dry goods salesman and then the general manager of New York's Hotel Colonial, and the former Edna Woolman Allaway, known as Edna Woolman Chase, an editor. Her mother, who became the editor-in-chief of Vogue, described Chase's father, whom she married in 1902, as "a lovable, good-looking, irresponsible young man from Boston. His father had been a banker, and depending on when you met them, the family had money." After her parents' divorce, her father married artist Theodora Larsh (1887–1955). Her mother's second husband was engineer Richard Newton.

After graduating from France's Château de Groslay boarding school, Chase made her society debut in December 1923 at a large dinner and dance, held in her honor and hosted by her mother at the Cosmopolitan Club in New York City. The 250 guests included her mother's employer, Condé Nast, Vanity Fair editor-in-chief Frank Crowninshield, artist Abram Poole and his wife, Mercedes de Acosta, interior decorators Ruby Ross Goodnow and Nancy McClelland, artist Albert Sterner, future Harper's Bazaar editor-in-chief Carmel Snow, British nobleman and pilot Viscount Holmesdale, architect Harrie T. Lindeberg, and fashion designer Adrian.

Stage

Chase's Broadway debut occurred in 1924 in The Red Falcon. Her stage appearances included roles in Days Without End, Forsaking All Others, While Parents Sleep, Small Miracle, On to Fortune, Tampico, Co-Respondent Unknown, Keep Off the Grass, and In Bed We Cry, an adaptation of her novel of the same name. She was in the original Broadway cast of Clare Boothe Luce's play The Women (1938), and many years later appeared in Neil Simon's Broadway hit Barefoot in the Park.

Films
Her films included Fast and Loose (1930), The Animal Kingdom (1932), Now, Voyager (1942), Once a Sinner (1950), and The Big Knife (1955). Her last motion picture was in Ocean's 11 (1960) as Mrs. Restes.

Radio
In the early 1940s, Chase was the hostess for Penthouse Party on CBS and Luncheon Date With Ilka Chase, on NBC Red. For several years, she hosted the radio program Luncheon at the Waldorf.

Television
Chase appeared as a panelist on several programs in the early years of television, including Celebrity Time (1949–50), Who Said That? (1950–55), and Masquerade Party (1952–56). She hosted the 1950–51 TV series Fashion Magic.

In 1957, Chase performed the role of the Stepmother in the television production of Rodgers and Hammerstein's Cinderella, which starred Julie Andrews. In 1963, she made a rare television sitcom appearance as Aunt Pauline on The Patty Duke Show. 

Chase was a regular in The Trials of O'Brien on CBS in the mid-1960s.

Writing
Her novel In Bed We Cry appeared in 1943 and was adapted for the stage, with Chase in the leading role.

Her autobiography Past Imperfect (volume I), in which she wrote, "Those who never fail are those who never try," was published in 1942, and Free Admission (volume II) was published in 1948. She also wrote more than a dozen other books, including The Care and Feeding of Friends, a guide to lighthearted entertaining with over 80 recipes and 20 menus.

Personal life
Chase was married to:
 Louis Calhern (1895–1956), the stage and movie actor. Chase and Calhern met while performing in summer stock with the George Cukor Company in Rochester, New York, married in June 1926, and divorced six months later, in February 1927.
 William Buckley Murray (1889–1949), a former music critic of The Brooklyn Daily Eagle and onetime executive of NBC. He also had been a concert manager for the Baldwin Piano Company and became the head of radio and television at the William Morris Agency. In 1932, Chase and Murray adapted We Are No Longer Children, a play by French playwright Leopold Marchand. They married on 13 July 1935, in Greenwich, Connecticut, and divorced in Las Vegas, Nevada, on 4 December 1946. By this marriage, she had one stepson, William Buckley Murray, Jr., a crime novelist and writer for The New Yorker, who was Murray's only child by his previous wife, Natalia Danesi, an opera singer and lover of Janet Flanner. Murray's third wife was interior decorator Florence Smolen.
 Norton Sager Brown (1904–1995), a physician. Chase and Brown divorced their spouses so they could be married on 7 December 1946, in Las Vegas, Nevada. They remained married until her death in 1978. By this marriage, Chase had a stepson, James Brown.

Death
Chase died of internal hemorrhaging on February 14, 1978, in Mexico City, Mexico. She was 72.  She was buried beside her mother in Locust Valley Cemetery.

Reference materials
Chase's personal papers, as well as those of her mother, are in the Billy Rose Theatre Division of the New York Public Library.

Filmography

Bibliography

Novels

Non-fiction

Memoirs

Essays and reporting

Critical studies and reviews of Chase's work
In bed we cry

References

External links

 
 
 
 Ilka Chase papers, 1850-1977 bulk (1916-1977), held by the Billy Rose Theatre Division, New York Public Library for the Performing Arts
 Photographic portraits of Ilka Chase by Cecil Beaton, Arnold Genthe, Man Ray, and Edward Steichen, 1925-1930s, held by the Billy Rose Theatre Division, New York Public Library for the Performing Arts

1905 births
1978 deaths
20th-century American actresses
20th-century American novelists
20th-century American women writers
Actresses from New York City
American expatriates in France
American film actresses
American radio actresses
American stage actresses
American television actresses
American women novelists
Burials at Westchester Hills Cemetery
Esquire (magazine) people